The MAV-1 (Maneuvering  Air Vehicle) is a low observable Unmanned Air Vehicle prototype developed between ST Aerospace and Defence Science and Technology Agency for its swarming unmanned air vehicle research programme. The prototype was unveiled in Asian Aerospace 2004 and the first test flight was reported in 2005.

References
ST Aero presses on with MAV-1, 28 Feb 2006

Unmanned aerial vehicles of Singapore
Military robots
Military equipment of Singapore
MAV-1